Good & Evil is the second studio album by American rock band Tally Hall, released on June 21, 2011 by Quack! Media. Originally to be released under Atlantic Records, the album ended up being released under their original label due to unknown circumstances. It has since been reissued on vinyl, CD, and cassette by Needlejuice Records. The album received mixed reviews, with some finding it a more "mature" effort than its predecessor, though also lacking the memorability of the band's debut album.

Production

In late April 2009, the band posted a scheduled event on their Facebook page entitled "Tally Hall May Tour," with a subtitle of "The Last Pre-Recording Hurrah."  It stated that, after a number of shows in May, they would begin recording their second album.

On October 19, 2009, Tally Hall began pre-production on the album. October 26, 2009 marked the first official day of recording at The Sunset Sound Factory, with Grammy-nominated producer Tony Hoffer and engineer Todd Burke. Through Ross Federman's Twitter, it was revealed that they were recording 16 tracks; however, the album was announced to have 14 instead.

On November 26, 2009 (Thanksgiving Day), the band announced via Twitter that they had completed tracking, leaving them one day to prepare for their tour with Rooney and Crash Kings.

On May 2, 2011, the band released their first single off the album, "You & Me", on the music webzine Consequence of Sound. The following day, the single was officially released on iTunes.

On June 20, 2011, the band released the track "&" via their YouTube account.

The album is currently available through their official website, as well as online services iTunes, Amazon MP3, and Napster. It was also released on CD, vinyl, cassette, minidisc, and digital download.

Track listing

Personnel

Tally Hall
Rob Cantor - guitar, vocals, songwriting
Joe Hawley - guitar, vocals, percussion, songwriting
Zubin Sedghi - bass, vocals, songwriting
Andrew Horowitz - keyboards, vocals, songwriting
Ross Federman - drums, percussion, backing vocals on "Hymn for a Scarecrow" and "Turn the Lights Off", co-songwriting on "Light & Night"

Additional musicians
Bora Karaca - whistling on "Hymn for a Scarecrow", backing vocals on "Turn the Lights Off"
Nellie McKay - co-lead vocals on "Light & Night"

Technical personnel
Tony Hoffer - producer and mixer
Todd Burke - recording
Wren Rider - studio tech
Dave Cooley - mastering
Joe Hawley - art direction & design

References

Tally Hall albums
2011 albums